The following is a list of Teen Choice Award winners and nominees for Choice Music - Tour or Choice Music - Summer Tour.

Winners and nominees

2000s

2010s

References

Tour